, abbreviated to , is a public university in Japan. The main campus (Kawasumi) is located in Mizuho-ku, Nagoya City. Other three campuses (Yamanohata, Tanabe-dori and Kita Chikusa) are also located in the city. Nagoya City University has been ranked the highest among public universities which is also one of leading universities in Japan.

History 
So NCU originally had two faculties: Medical School and Faculty of Pharmaceutical Sciences.

NCU has added divisions and graduate schools as follows:
1955: College of General Education
1961: Doctoral course for the Division of Medicine
1964: Faculty of Economics
1966: Doctoral course for the Division of Pharmaceutical Sciences
1970: Doctoral course for the Division of Economics
1988: College of Nursing
1996: School of Humanities and Social Sciences / School of Design and Architecture
(by reorganizing and merging College of General Education, Nagoya Municipal Women's College [founded in 1947] and Nagoya City College of Child Education [founded in 1946])
1999: School of Nursing (by reorganizing College of Nursing)

Below are the histories of two preceding colleges of NCU:

Nagoya City Women's Medical College
In 1947, after the war, the college became a university (daigaku) under Japan's older education system. In 1950 NCWMC was merged into NCU and became Medical School (a coeducational school). The old campus of NCWMC is NCU Tanabe-dori Campus today.

Nagoya Pharmaceutical College
This was a private school run by Nagoya Pharmaceutical Co., Ltd. (Nakakita Co., Ltd. today). In 1890 the school was renamed Aichi School of Pharmacy. The school was abolished in 1921, because it could not afford to meet the new requirement of Japanese pharmacist test (The requirement was that the examinees should be the graduates of 3-year pharmaceutical schools; Aichi School of Pharmacy had only a 2.5-year course.).

The alumni revived the school in 1931 as Aichi Higher School of Pharmacy, which had a 3-year course. In 1935 the school developed into . During World War II, shortage of fuel gas struck the college, and in 1946 the college was municipalized by Nagoya City and became coeducational. In 1949 the college was reorganized into new , under Japanese new educational system. In 1950 NPC was merged into NCU to constitute the Faculty of Pharmaceutical Sciences. The old campus of NPC is Takinomizu Park today (located in Midori-ku, Nagoya).

Graduate schools 
 Medical Sciences (in Kawasumi Campus)
 Pharmaceutical Sciences (in Tanabe-dori Campus)
 Economics (in Yamanohata Campus)
 Humanities and Social Sciences (in Yamanohata Campus)
 Design and Architecture (in Kita Chikusa Campus)
 Nursing (in Kawasumi Campus)
 Natural Sciences (in Yamanohata Campus)

Undergraduate schools 
 Medical School (in Kawasumi Campus)
 Faculty of Pharmaceutical Sciences (in Tanabe-dori Campus)
 Faculty of Economics (in Yamanohata Campus)
 School of Humanities and Social Sciences (in Yamanohata Campus)
 School of Design and Architecture (in Kita Chikusa Campus)
 School of Nursing (in Kawasumi Campus)

Institutes 
 Library and Information Processing Center
 University Hospital
 Institute of Molecular Medicine
 Center for Experimental Animal Science
 Advanced Pharmaceutical Sciences Center
 Institute of Economic Research
 Institute for Studies in Humanities and Cultures
 Institute of Natural Sciences

References

External links
Official Website (English)
Official Website (Japanese)

Public universities in Japan
Universities and colleges in Nagoya
Educational institutions established in 1950
1950 establishments in Japan